The 4th constituency of the Ain is a French legislative constituency in the Ain département.

Members elected

Election results

2022

 
 
 
|-
| colspan="8" bgcolor="#E9E9E9"|
|-
 

 
 
 
 
 * Incumbent Stéphane Trompille ran as a dissident member of La République En Marche! without the support of the Ensemble Citoyens coalition.

2017

2012

|- style="background-color:#E9E9E9;text-align:center;"
! colspan="2" rowspan="2" style="text-align:left;" | Candidate
! rowspan="2" colspan="2" style="text-align:left;" | Party
! colspan="2" | 1st round
! colspan="2" | 2nd round
|- style="background-color:#E9E9E9;text-align:center;"
! width="75" | Votes
! width="30" | %
! width="75" | Votes
! width="30" | %
|-
| style="background-color:" |
| style="text-align:left;" | Michel Voisin
| style="text-align:left;" | Union for a Popular Movement
| UMP
| 
| 40.73%
| 
| 56.96%
|-
| style="background-color:" |
| style="text-align:left;" | Guillaume Lacroix
| style="text-align:left;" | Radical Party of the Left
| PRG
| 
| 31.32%
| 
| 43.04%
|-
| style="background-color:" |
| style="text-align:left;" | Corinne Mossire
| style="text-align:left;" | National Front
| FN
| 
| 19.07%
| colspan="2" style="text-align:left;" |
|-
| style="background-color:" |
| style="text-align:left;" | Daniel Blatrix
| style="text-align:left;" | Left Front
| FG
| 
| 3.17%
| colspan="2" style="text-align:left;" |
|-
| style="background-color:" |
| style="text-align:left;" | Nicolas Zielinski
| style="text-align:left;" | The Greens
| VEC
| 
| 3.09%
| colspan="2" style="text-align:left;" |
|-
| style="background-color:" |
| style="text-align:left;" | Michèle Vianes
| style="text-align:left;" | Miscellaneous Right
| DVD
| 
| 1.29%
| colspan="2" style="text-align:left;" |
|-
| style="background-color:" |
| style="text-align:left;" | Laurence Mayer
| style="text-align:left;" | Ecologist
| ECO
| 
| 0.61%
| colspan="2" style="text-align:left;" |
|-
| style="background-color:" |
| style="text-align:left;" | Jean-François Mortel
| style="text-align:left;" | Far Left
| ExG
| 
| 0.39%
| colspan="2" style="text-align:left;" |
|-
| style="background-color:" |
| style="text-align:left;" | Electre Dracos
| style="text-align:left;" | Far Left
| ExG
| 
| 0.33%
| colspan="2" style="text-align:left;" |
|-
| colspan="8" style="background-color:#E9E9E9;"|
|- style="font-weight:bold"
| colspan="4" style="text-align:left;" | Total
| 
| 100%
| 
| 100%
|-
| colspan="8" style="background-color:#E9E9E9;"|
|-
| colspan="4" style="text-align:left;" | Registered voters
| 
| style="background-color:#E9E9E9;"|
| 
| style="background-color:#E9E9E9;"|
|-
| colspan="4" style="text-align:left;" | Blank/Void ballots
| 
| 1.31%
| 
| 2.65%
|-
| colspan="4" style="text-align:left;" | Turnout
| 
| 58.97%
| 
| 55.81%
|-
| colspan="4" style="text-align:left;" | Abstentions
| 
| 41.03%
| 
| 44.19%
|-
| colspan="8" style="background-color:#E9E9E9;"|
|- style="font-weight:bold"
| colspan="6" style="text-align:left;" | Result
| colspan="2" style="background-color:" | UMP HOLD
|}

2007

References

Sources
 Official results of French elections from 1998: 

4